Anders Kent Peter Peterson (born April 9, 1965 in Halmstad, Halland) is a former Swedish swimmer. He participated at the 1984 Summer Olympics, competing in individual medley events. He finished 9th in the 400 m individual medley and 20th in the 200 m individual medley.

Clubs
Mariestads SS

References

1965 births
Swedish male medley swimmers
Living people
Swimmers at the 1984 Summer Olympics
Olympic swimmers of Sweden
Sportspeople from Halmstad
Sportspeople from Halland County